Sam Hay is an Australian rules football field umpire in the Australian Football League.

Based in South Australia, Hay umpired the 2005, 2007 and 2008 South Australian National Football League (SANFL) Grand Finals. He made the AFL Senior Panel in 2009, umpiring his first AFL game in that year.

Hay also won the 2008 SANFL Golden Whistle, recognizing him as the best umpire in the state for that year.

References

Year of birth missing (living people)
Living people
Australian Football League umpires
South Australian National Football League umpires
Sportspeople from Adelaide